The 1996 24 Hours of Le Mans was the 64th Grand Prix of Endurance, and took place on 15 and 16 June 1996. It was won by a Tom Walkinshaw-Porsche prototype run by Joest Racing with drivers Davy Jones, Manuel Reuter and Le Mans rookie Alexander Wurz completing 354 laps. While not being the fastest car on track, it hit the front in the first hour and aside from several pit-stop overlaps, was never headed as other teams hit mechanical troubles during the race. This was Reuter's second Le Mans victory, and the first for Jones (after finishing as runner-up in 1991 with Jaguar) and Wurz, who, at 22 years old, became the youngest ever Le Mans overall winner.

Regulations and Entries
Still very satisfied with its equivalency formulae between the prototypes and GTs, the Automobile Club de l'Ouest (ACO) made only slight adjustments to its regulations, by including engine volume and turbo boost into its calculations. LMP1 and P2 got closer to the IMSA-WSC category with new, updated, bodywork dimensions.

The summary, as compared to the 1995 regulations was:
 LM WSC (P1)       max 5.1L or 3.0L (turbo), fuel tank 80L, max tyre width 16",  min weight 875 kg
 LM P2:       max 3.4L or 2.0L (turbo), fuel tank 62L, max tyre width 14",  min weight 650 kg 
 LM GT1:      max 8.0L or 4.0L (turbo), fuel tank 100L, max tyre width 14" (front) & 12" (rear),  min weight based on a sliding scale
 LM GT2 had the same specifications as the LM GT1

In GT1, major engine modifications were now allowed while GT2 still had to use series-production engines.

This year the ACO halved the number of automatic entries from 20 to 10. They received an initial 107 applications and accepted 66 for pre-Qualifying in April on top of the automatic-10, to pare down to 53 for race week (48 starters + 5 reserves).

Still with no co-ordinated European sports car series after the demise of the World Sportscar Championship after the 1992 season, there were only 14 prototypes, albeit of a high quality. As expected, the bulk of the field was in GT: 27 cars in GT1 plus 12 in GT2. Many teams came from the thriving BPR Global series.

In prototypes, Kremer and Courage returned, this time challenged by a new Porsche prototype developed by Joest Racing in conjunction with TWR Motorsport. The TWR-Porsche WSC-95 was born from the shell of a TWR-designed Jaguar XJR-14 racing car, modified to an open top design by Tom Walkinshaw Racing, and fitted with the Porsche 962 engine.

Three IMSA-WSC cars turned up: two Ferrari 333 SP's run by Scandia Racing versus the much-improved Riley & Scott (winner of the Daytona and Sebring enduros). In another small LM P2 field of four cars, Welter and Bonnet were joined by a Kudzu-Mazda stepping across from WSC and now run directly by the Mazdaspeed works team.

In GT1, defending champions McLaren-BMW had updated 1996-spec cars, with tighter air restrictors dropping the power output slightly. This time they included a pair run as a BMW works team (through their Italian partners Bigazzi). The McLarens were joined again by Nissan, Toyota and Lister (now sponsored by Newcastle United Football Club). Chrysler-Dodge returned with a quartet of Vipers with their big rumbling 8-litre engines; one pair run by ORECA in the BPR and the second pair by Canaska-Southwind in the North American series.

But, perhaps as might be expected, the big news was with Porsche and the new 911 GT1 - yet again courting controversy. This was, quite literally, virtually a Porsche 911 in name only, with the visual similarity of a squashed, lengthened 911. This was Porsche's first ever mid-engined car, using a purpose-designed 3.2L flat-six, twin-turbo, water-cooled (another first for Porsche) engine. The first chassis was ready in March, and with only two road-going cars it got EU GT1 homologation (again, like the Dauer-Porsche of '94, using the "promised-production" clause).

Qualification
The fastest practice times this year were being done by the prototypes. In the first instance Eric van der Poele, this year in the Scandia Ferrari, set the initial pace. But it was Pierluigi Martini (just out of F1) who set the pole in his Joest TWR-Porsche, just a tenth of a second ahead of the Courage of Jérôme Policand. Van der Poele was third ahead of the 911 GT1s of Wendlinger and Wollek, and Taylor in the Riley & Scott.

In a novel change this year the ACO decided to line up the first dozen cars on the grid with the six fastest cars from each category two-by-two - prototypes on the left and GT cars on the right. With only a second between the first five cars this was not as skewed as might have seemed, giving further credence to the equivalency regulations. The first McLaren was Bigazzi's Steve Soper in 8th place (but starting 6th as the 3rd-fastest GT1 car). In LMP2 the WRs would be here for the last time (the ACO regulations for 1997 demanded 2-seater vehicles). They could not repeat the heroics of 1995, when they started on the front row of the grid. This year Gonin was 12th fastest, more than four seconds off last year's pole time. David in the other WR was a further 3 seconds slower. But their opposition fared worse - the new Kudzu was 23rd on the grid and the Debora, after electronics problems in Qualifying, then blew its engine on the morning warm-up and would not take the start.

In GT2, the predictable crowd of privateer Porsche 911s (in the current 993 GT2 version) were up against the Kunimitsu Honda NSX, back to defend its win last year. There was only a single Callaway (from Agusta) and a new Marcos from the small English company. Fastest was the Porsche of Roock Racing, a new team coming from the German GT series, setting the pace in the BPR series this year. It had a comfortable margin over the Callaway and the Porsche of the PARR Motorsport team from New Zealand (here celebrating 30 years since the three NZ drivers Bruce McLaren, Chris Amon and Denny Hulme finished first and second for Ford's first Le Mans win).

Race

Start
The start was brought forward to 3pm to accommodate the thousands of British fans on site to watch the England-Scotland football match at the Euro championships. Unlike last year's heavy rain, the race started in sunshine. Dalmas and Wollek in the works Porsche GT1s raced into the lead for the first four laps until overtaken in turn by the two Joest TWR-Porsches of Jones & Theys. With wider tyres,  lower weights and better aerodynamics the TWRs were able to make a break on the field while others had their problems: Boutsen and Dalmas both fell off the track, losing minutes. Cottaz, in the fastest Courage, had kept up with the top four initially, but lost time in the second hour with electronics issues. Likewise the best Kremer was well in the top ten. Both cars in the Gulf and Bigazzi McLaren teams filled out the lower half of the top ten.

Night
The Joest cars maintained a comfortable 1–2 lead going into the night. The veteran team of Wollek/Stuck/Boutsen kept in touch in the Porsche GT1 and finally took back second place at half-race distance from Theys' pole-sitting TWR. After its delays, the Cottaz/Alliot/Policand Courage had quickly moved back up through the field and was fourth and fifth, until Alliot crashed the Courage at Tertre Rouge just after dawn. The remaining Ferrari prototype (sponsored by a charity of 1001 Belgian royalty, celebrities and citizens) had tyre problems at the start, but like the Courage it had steadily made up places to be fifth.

The Riley & Scott, American enduro-champ, had run well during the day despite being excessively thirsty, but after several offs it slipped down the board and at 2.30am it broke down marooning Pace on the Mulsanne.

At 4.30 Duez, running 7th, bought the first Bigazzi McLaren into the pits stuck in gear. After two gearbox changes during the next day, they eventually finished 11th. The Ferrari F40s were never as competitive as the previous year and by dawn all four cars had retired, including a short, sudden, spectacular fuel-fire in the pits for the Ratel entry.

Morning
A charging triple stint by Stuck almost got the Porsche GT1 to the front, but the leaders always had enough in hand. At 9.20 Martini dropped the second TWR in the gravel at the first Mulsanne chicane, and the time spent doing repairs dropped them to fourth, behind Ray Bellm's Gulf McLaren. But then the McLaren was stopped for a gearbox change at midday, taking 90 minutes, and dropping them in turn down to 10th. After several offs by Wendlinger and Goodyear in the night, the second Porsche GT1 had fallen down to 12th, but by early-morning had recovered back to fifth. The other Bigazzi McLaren of F1 champion Nelson Piquet, just like its sister car, was in 7th place when it too was stopped for an hour with a gearbox change. With race attrition they were able to get back to 8th by the finish, just ahead of Bellm's Gulf McLaren.

Just after dawn, the Ferrari needed a gearbox change, taking half an hour, dropping it to 10th. Van der Poele then took off, setting the race's fastest lap several times then at 7am, when back into fifth, Éric Bachelart crashed out at the Esses.

In GT2, the leading Roock Racing Porsche had to replace its driveshaft at midday, but had enough in hand to keep its lead.

Finish and Post-race
The Jones/Reuter/Wurz car never missed a beat, and was never headed on the scoring charts. In the end they won by a lap from the Porsche GT1, yet again Bob Wollek was beaten back to second place (and yet again, stymied by time lost to off-track excursions). At just 22 years of age, Alexander Wurz became the youngest ever Le Mans winner, starting an F1 career exactly a year later to the day, with Benetton at the Canadian Grand Prix. Reinhold Joest's deal with Porsche said that he could keep the car if it was a race-winner, and it was to reappear again for the 1997 race.

With only 40 minutes remaining, the driveshaft broke on the second TWR, stranding the unlucky Martini out on the circuit at Arnage. Third place fell into the lap of the other Porsche GT1, finishing a distant 13 laps behind the winners. McLarens took the next three places: the two troubled DPR-team cars and the second car from Gulf Racing. These included Derek Bell, finally drawing the curtain on an illustrious Le Mans career at the age of 54; a career of over 25 years, it included five outright victories and a pair of 2nd-places, as well as winning the Daytona 24 hours three times and twice winning the World Sportscar Championship, thus marking him as one of the all-time great sports car drivers.

Seventh was the Pescarolo/Lagorce/Collard Courage of the La Filière team (a motorsport academy at the Le Mans circuit), and the second prototype home. Down 27 laps they lost an hour replacing a clutch during the night.

The Roock Racing Porsche easily won the GT2 class finishing 12th overall and four laps ahead of the PARR Motorsport Porsche. The Kiwi Porsche had a trouble-free race, spending the least time in the pits of any car except for the winning TWR-Porsche. The Japanese GTs were uncompetitive against the Porsches and McLarens, and those that did finish were well down the board.
The Kudzu-Mazda was the only LMP2 finisher, coming in at the back of the field nearly 100 laps behind the winners.

After Le Mans, the Porsche works team entered their GT1s in three races of the BPR Global series, winning all three. In the new year, they sold further cars to customer teams, usurping McLaren to become the new dominant force in GT racing.

Andy Evans, owner of the Scandia Team running the Ferrari prototypes, along with Roberto Muller (ex-CEO of Reebok) bought control of the American IMSA organisation, and the changes led to the resignation of a number of the board members and the formation of a breakaway series by the USRRC.

Official results

Statistics
 Pole Position - Pierluigi Martini, #8 Joest Racing - 3:46.682
 Fastest Lap - Eric van de Poele, #17 Racing For Belgium / Team Scandia - 3:46.958
 Distance - 4814.4 km
 Average Speed - 200.6 km/h
 Highest Trap Speed — Courage C36 - 332 km/h (race)
 Attendance - 168000

Notes

References
 Spurring, Quentin (2014)    Le Mans 1990-99    Sherborne, Dorset: Evro Publishing  
 Laban, Brian (2001)    Le Mans 24 Hours    London: Virgin Books

External links
 Racing Sports Cars – Le Mans 24 Hours 1996 entries, results, technical detail, photo gallery. Retrieved 10 July 2016.
 Le Mans History – Le Mans History, hour-by-hour (incl. pictures, YouTube links). Retrieved 10 July 2016.
 Formula 2 – Le Mans 1995 results & reserve entries. Retrieved 10 July 2016.
 Motorsport Magazine – Motorsport Magazine archive. Retrieved 10 July 2016.
 You-Tube – 40-minute review of the 1996 race. Retrieved 10 July 2016.

Le Mans
24 Hours of Le Mans
24 Hours of Le Mans races